An infrared heater or heat lamp is a heating appliance containing a high-temperature emitter that transfers energy to a cooler object through electromagnetic radiation. No contact or medium between the emitter and cool object is needed for the energy transfer. Infrared heaters can be operated in vacuum or atmosphere.

One classification of infrared heaters is by the wavelength bands of infrared emission.

 Far infrared or dark emitters for everything above .

History
German-British astronomer Sir William Herschel is credited with the discovery of infrared in 1800. He made an instrument called a spectrometer to measure the magnitude of radiant power at different wavelengths. This instrument was made from three pieces. The first was a prism to catch the sunlight and direct and disperse the colors down onto a table, the second was a small panel of cardboard with a slit wide enough for only a single color to pass through it and finally, three mercury-in-glass thermometers. Through his experiment Herschel found that red light had the highest degree of temperature change in the light spectrum, however, infrared heating was not commonly used until World War II. During World War II infrared heating became more widely used and recognized. The main applications were in the metal finishing fields, particularly in the curing and drying of paints and lacquers on military equipment. Banks of lamp bulbs were used very successfully; though by today's standards the power intensities were very low, the technique offered much faster drying times than the fuel convection ovens of the time. After World War II the adoption of infrared heating techniques continued but on a much slower basis. In the mid 1950s the motor vehicle industry began to show interest in the capabilities of infrared for paint curing and a number of production line infrared tunnels came into use.

Elements
The most common filament material used for electrical infrared heaters is tungsten wire, which is coiled to provide more surface area. Low temperature alternatives for tungsten are carbon, or alloys of iron, chromium, and aluminum (trademark and brand name Kanthal).  While carbon filaments are more fickle to produce, they heat up much more quickly than a comparable medium-wave heater based on a FeCrAl filament.

When light is undesirable or not necessary in a heater, ceramic infrared radiant heaters are the preferred choice. Containing  of coiled alloy resistance wire, they emit a uniform heat across the entire surface of the heater and the ceramic is 90% absorbent of the radiation. As absorption and emission are based on the same physical causes in each body, ceramic is ideally suited as a material for infrared heaters.

Industrial infrared heaters sometimes use a gold coating on the quartz tube that reflects the infrared radiation and directs it towards the product to be heated. Consequently, the infrared radiation impinging on the product is virtually doubled. Gold is used because of its oxidation resistance and very high infrared reflectivity of approximately 95%.

Types
Infrared heaters are commonly used in infrared modules (or emitter banks) combining several heaters to achieve larger heated areas.

Infrared heaters are usually classified by the wavelength they emit:

Near infrared (NIR) or short-wave infrared heaters operate at high filament temperatures above  and when arranged in a field reach high power densities of some hundreds of kW/m. Their peak wavelength is well below the absorption spectrum for water, making them unsuitable for many drying applications. They are well suited for heating of silica where a deep penetration is needed.

Far infrared emitters (FIR) are typically used in the so-called low-temperature far infrared saunas. These constitute only the higher and more expensive range of the market of infrared sauna. Instead of using carbon, quartz or high watt ceramic emitters, which emit near and medium infrared radiation, heat and light, far infrared emitters use low watt ceramic plates that remain cold, while still emitting far infrared radiation.

The relationship between temperature and peak wavelength is expressed by Wien's displacement law.

Metal wire element
Metal wire heating elements first appeared in the 1920s. These elements consist of wire made from chromel. Chromel is made from nickel and chrome and it is also known as nichrome. This wire was then coiled into a spiral and wrapped around a ceramic body. When heated to high temperatures it forms a protective layer of chromium oxide which protects the wire from burning and corrosion, and causes the element to glow.

Heat lamps

A heat lamp is an incandescent light bulb that is used for the principal purpose of creating heat. The spectrum of black-body radiation emitted by the lamp is shifted to produce more infrared light. Many heat lamps include a red filter to minimize the amount of visible light emitted. Heat lamps often include an internal reflector.

Heat lamps are commonly used in shower and bathrooms to warm bathers and in food-preparation areas of restaurants to keep food warm before serving. They are also commonly used for animal husbandry. Lights used for poultry are often called brooding lamps. Aside from young birds, other types of animals which can benefit from heat lamps include reptiles, amphibians, insects, arachnids, and the young of some mammals.

The sockets used for heat lamps are usually ceramic because plastic sockets can melt or burn when exposed to the large amount of waste heat produced by the lamps, especially when operated in the "base up" position. The shroud or hood of the lamp is generally metal. There may be a wire guard over the front of the shroud, to prevent touching the hot surface of the bulb.

Ordinary household white incandescent bulbs can also be used as heat lamps, but red and blue bulbs are sold for use in brood lamps and reptile lamps. 250 watt heat lamps are commonly packaged in the "R40" (5" reflector lamp) form factor with an intermediate screw base.

Heat lamps can be used as a medical treatment to provide dry heat when other treatments are ineffective or impractical.

Ceramic infrared heat systems
Ceramic infrared heating elements are used in a diverse range of industrial processes where long wave infrared radiation is required. Their useful wavelength range is 2–10 μm. They are often used in the area of animal/pet healthcare too.  The ceramic infrared heaters (emitters) are manufactured with three basic emitter faces: trough (concave), flat, and bulb or Edison screw element for normal installation via an E27 ceramic lamp holder.

Far-infrared
This heating technology is used in some expensive infrared saunas. It is also found in energy efficient space heaters. They are usually fairly big flat panels that are placed on walls, ceilings or integrated in floors. These heaters emit long wave infrared radiation using low watt density ceramic emitters based on carbon fibre technology. More efficient designs use carbon crystals, a combination of carbon fibre, integrated with nanotechnology, transforming carbon into nanometer form. Because the heating elements are at a relatively low temperature, far-infrared heaters do not give emissions and smell from dust, dirt, formaldehyde, toxic fumes from paint-coating, etc. This has made this type of space heating very popular among people with severe allergies and multiple chemical sensitivity in Europe. Because far infrared technology does not heat the air of the room directly, it is important to maximize the exposure of available surfaces which then re-emit the warmth to provide an even all round ambient warmth. This is known as radiant heating.

Quartz heat lamps

Halogen lamps are incandescent lamps filled with highly pressurized inert gas combined with a small amount of  halogen gas (bromine or iodine); this lengthens the life of the filament (see ). This leads to a much longer life of halogen lamps than other incandescent lamps. Due to the high pressure and temperature halogen lamps produce, they are relatively small and made out of quartz glass because it has a higher melting point than standard glass. Common uses for halogen lamps are table top heaters.

Quartz infrared heating elements emit medium wave infrared energy and are particularly effective in systems where rapid heater response is required. Tubular infrared lamps in quartz bulbs produce infrared radiation in wavelengths of 1.5–8 μm. To achieve even higher power densities, halogen lamps were used. Quartz infrared lamps are used in highly polished reflectors to direct radiation in a uniform and concentrated pattern.

Quartz heat lamps are used in food processing, chemical processing, paint drying, and thawing of frozen materials. They can also be used for comfort heating in cold areas, in incubators, and in other applications for heating, drying, and baking.

Most common designs consist of either a satin milky-white quartz glass tube or clear quartz with an electrically resistant element, usually a tungsten wire, or a thin coil of iron-chromium-aluminum alloy. The atmospheric air is removed and filled with inert gases such as nitrogen and argon then sealed. In quartz halogen lamps, a small amount of halogen gas is added to prolong the heater's operational life.

The majority of the radiant energy released at operational temperatures is transmitted through the thin quartz tube but some of that energy is absorbed by the silica quartz glass tube causing the temperature of the tube wall to increase, this causes the silicon-oxygen bond to radiate far infrared rays. Quartz glass heating elements were originally designed for lighting applications, but when a lamp is at full power less than 5% of the emitted energy is in the visible spectrum.

Quartz tungsten

They reach operating temperature within seconds. Peak wavelength emissions of approximately 1.6 μm (medium wave infrared) and 1 μm (short wave infrared).

Carbon heater

Carbon heaters use a carbon fiber heating element capable of producing long, medium and short wave far infrared heat. They need to be accurately specified for the spaces to be heated.

Gas-fired
There are two basic types of infrared radiant heaters.
 Luminous or high intensity
 Radiant tube heaters
Radiant tube gas-fired heaters used for industrial and commercial building space heating burn natural gas or propane to heat a steel emitter tube. Gas passing through a control valve flows through a cup burner or a venturi. The combustion product gases heat the emitter tube.  As the tube heats, radiant energy from the tube strikes floors and other objects in the area, warming them. This form of heating maintains warmth even when a large volume of cold air is suddenly introduced, such as in maintenance garages. They cannot however, combat a cold draught.

The efficiency of an infrared heater is a rating of the total energy consumed by the heater compared to the amount of infrared energy generated. While there will always be some amount of convective heat generated through the process, any introduction of air motion across the heater will reduce its infrared conversion efficiency. With new untarnished reflectors, radiant tubes have a downward radiant efficiency of about 60%. (The other 40% comprises unrecoverable upwards radiant and convective losses, and flue losses.)

Health effects
In addition to the dangers of touching the hot bulb or element, high-intensity short-wave infrared radiation may cause indirect thermal burns when the skin is exposed for too long or the heater is positioned too close to the subject.  Individuals exposed to large amounts of infrared radiation (like glass blowers and arc welders) over an extended period of time may develop depigmentation of the iris and opacity of the aqueous humor, so exposure should be moderated.

Efficiency
Electrically heated infrared heaters radiate up to 86% of their input as radiant energy. Nearly all the electrical energy input is converted into infrared radiant heat in the filament and directed onto the target by reflectors. Some heat energy is removed from the heating element by conduction or convection, which may be no loss at all for some designs where all of the electrical energy is desired in the heated space, or may be considered a loss, in situations where only the radiative heat transfer is desired or productive.

For practical applications, the efficiency of the infrared heater depends on matching the emitted wavelength and the absorption spectrum of the material to be heated. This means that emission from medium-wave or carbon infrared heaters is much better absorbed by water and water-based coatings than NIR or short-wave infrared radiation. The same is true for many plastics like PVC or polyethylene. On the other hand, some metals absorb only in the short-wave range and show a strong reflectivity in the medium and far infrared. This makes a careful selection of the right infrared heater type important for energy efficiency in the heating process.

Ceramic elements operate in the temperature of  producing infrared wavelengths in the 2 to  range. Most plastics and many other materials absorb infrared best in this range, which makes the ceramic heater most suited for this task.

Applications

IR heaters can satisfy a variety of heating requirements, including:

 Extremely high temperatures, limited largely by the maximum temperature of the emitter
 Fast response time, on the order of 1–2 seconds
 Temperature gradients, especially on material webs with high heat input
 Focused heated area relative to conductive and convective heating methods
 Non-contact, thereby not disturbing the product as conductive or convective heating methods do

Thus, IR heaters are applied for many purposes including:

 Heating systems
 Curing of coatings
Space heaters
 Plastic shrinking
 Plastic heating prior to forming
 Plastic welding
 Glass & metal heat treating
 Cooking
 Warming suckling animals or captive animals in zoos or veterinary clinics

See also 

 Ceramic heater

References

Further reading
 Deshmukh, Yeshvant V.: Industrial Heating, Principles, Techniques, Materials, Applications, and Design. Taylor and Francis, Boca Raton, Fl.: 2005.
 Siegel, Robert and Howell, John R.: Thermal Radiation Heat Transfer. 3rd Ed. Taylor and Francis, Philadelphia.

Heating